Poplar Grove, Indiana is a neighborhood in Indianapolis located in southeastern Marion County. Poplar Grove is situated 7 miles (11.3 km) southeast of downtown Indianapolis and is located just beyond the eastern border of Beech Grove, Indiana. In the 1800s, Poplar Grove was the location of a railroad post office.

References

Neighborhoods in Indianapolis
Populated places in Marion County, Indiana
Indianapolis metropolitan area